Polistes adelphus is a species of Paper wasp of the genus Polistes.

References

adelphus
Insects described in 1978